Sharks XI Football Club is a Congolese football club based in Kinshasa, the capital of the Democratic Republic of the Congo.

History
In 2017, after playing four years in Linafoot, Shark XI FC withdrew from championship denouncing the "mismanagement" of the league.

Stadium
Currently the team plays at the Stade des Martyrs.

References

External links
Club profile - Soccerway.com

Football clubs in the Democratic Republic of the Congo
Football clubs in Kinshasa